Nova Hreod Academy (formerly Hreod Burna Senior High School, Hreod Parkway School and Nova Hreod College) is a mixed secondary school with academy status, located in Swindon, Wiltshire for students aged 11 to 16.

History
Hreod is the Anglo Saxon word for a reed. The small stream that runs along the bottom of the field where the school was built is called the Hreod Burna, from which the first school got its name. It is a term found in the Domesday Book entry for the locality and describes a minor tributary of the River Ray which still runs through the valley in which Nova Hreod Academy lies.

Hreod Burna Senior High School was opened in 1966 for students aged 14 to 18, and had a sixth form. Initially, children were drawn from Moredon Secondary and Ferndale Secondary.

The Head Teacher was Dr Blackwell, who remained at the school until 1984, just after New College opened to provide education for all sixth form students in the region. In 1983, Hreod Burna Senior High School amalgamated with Moredon Secondary School to form Hreod Parkway School, under the headship of Mr Cleall. Both Ferndale Secondary and Pinehurst Secondary were closed, and their buildings used for other activities by the local council.

In 1996 Hreod Parkway School was categorised by Ofsted as needing "special measures" to enable it to improve. It was again in special measures between February 2001 and November 2002.

Rebuilding
In 1997, Andrew Fleet took over as Head Teacher and set about repairing the school's academic reputation and rebuilding the campus, which had fallen into serious disrepair.

The inspectors identified a number of areas of improvement since the last inspection in 1996.

"The school was re-organised in 1998 so that the lower and upper schools were split either side of Akers Way. Plans were drawn up to completely rebuild the school. Mr Fleet introduced many new systems and procedures to raise standards, but these measures are yet to be applied consistently across the school by all teachers".

"We have not suddenly started work on these problems since Ofsted visited", Fleet said, "We have been addressing our problems ever since I arrived, but in some areas progress has been slower than we'd hoped. Being in special measures will actually help us accelerate certain changes that we need to make, as it will enable greater intervention by the school and the LEA to address the problem areas".

New campus

In Easter of 2007, Fleet achieved his goal when Hreod Parkway was vacated and everyone moved into the new campus built on an adjacent green field site. The new school was renamed Nova Hreod.

Julie Tridgell became Headteacher in September 2008. In 2009, and again in 2016, GCSE results put Nova Hreod on the list of the most improved schools in the country.

ULT Academy conversion and transformation
The school converted to Academy status during the 2013/14 school year, under the United Learning group. This conversion saw ULT's Darren Barton take over as Headteacher (Principal in ULT terms).

In 2015 the school's headline GCSE measures doubled to 60%. The following year, this increased to 62% of students gaining at least five A*-C grades including English and Maths.  In February 2017, Ofsted inspectors judged the school to be 'Good', the first time in the school's history that it had achieved such a rating.

References

External links

Secondary schools in Swindon
Educational institutions established in 1966
1966 establishments in England
Academies in Swindon
United Learning schools